Transitional Military Council might refer to one Chadian and two Sudanese bodies:

Transitional Military Council (1985), which overthrew Sudanese president Jaafar Nimeiry
Transitional Military Council (2019), which overthrew Sudanese president Omar al-Bashir
Transitional Military Council (Chad), which took power after the death of Chadian president Idriss Déby

See also
Military Council for other similarly named bodies